Genista linifolia is a species of broom known by the common names Mediterranean broom, needle-leaved broom and flax broom. It is native to southwestern Europe, North Africa, and the Canary Islands.

Description 
This is a shrub with hairy green stems and branches which can exceed two meters in height. Its leaves are made up of tough, green, lance-shaped leaflets with woolly undersides. Flowers appear in dense raceme inflorescences toward the ends of the branches. The flowers are bright yellow and pealike. The fruit is a hairy legume pod one to four centimeters long containing several seeds.

Invasive plant species
It can be found on other continents in areas of similar Mediterranean climate, such as California in the United States, Australia and New Zealand. It has become an invasive species in those regions.

References

External links

Jepson Manual Treatment
Photo gallery

linifolia
Flora of the Canary Islands
Flora of North Africa
Flora of Spain
Matorral shrubland
Taxa named by Carl Linnaeus